Don Bosco College, Itanagar, established in 2002, is a general degree college at Jollang in Itanagar, Arunachal Pradesh. It offers undergraduate courses in arts and commerce. It is affiliated to  Rajiv Gandhi University.

Departments

Arts and commerce

English
History
Political Science
Education
Economics
Commerce
hindi

Accreditation
The college is recognized by the University Grants Commission (UGC).

References

External links
https://dbcitanagar.com/

Colleges affiliated to Rajiv Gandhi University
Educational institutions established in 2002
Universities and colleges in Arunachal Pradesh
2002 establishments in Arunachal Pradesh